"La Nota" is a song recorded by Colombian singer Manuel Turizo, with Puerto Rican singer Rauw Alejandro and Puerto Rican rapper Myke Towers for Turizo's second studio album, Dopamina (2020). It was written by Juan Medina, Turizo, Towers, Michael Torres, and Alejandro, while the production was handled by Zenzei, Tainy, and Julián Turizo. The song was released for digital download and streaming by La Industria, Inc. and Sony Music Latin on October 8, 2020, as the second single from the album. A Spanish language reggaeton song, it is about a young unmarried woman, whose mysterious and flirtatious manner drives men crazy. The track received widely positive reviews from music critics, who complimented its energy and catchy melody.

"La Nota" was nominated for Urban Song Of The Year at the 2022 Premio Lo Nuestro. The song was commercially successful, reaching number one in five countries, including Mexico and Spain, as well as the top five in several other countries such as Dominican Republic and Peru, and on Billboards Hot Latin Songs in the United States. It also reached the summit of the Latin Airplay and Latin Rhythm Airplay charts. The song has received several certifications, including Latin 11× platinum in the United States. An accompanying music video, released simultaneously with the song, was directed by Daniel Duran and depicts the three singers turning into real-life toys, trying to catch the attention of their desired girl at an empty arcade cabinet and toy store. To promote the song, Turizo, Alejandro, and Towers performed it at the 2020 Billboard Latin Music Awards.

Background and release
Inspired by good vibes and fun, Manuel Turizo and his team composed "La Nota" for Turizo's second studio album, Dopamina (2021). Since he wanted "a strong rapper" on the song, he showed it to Myke Towers, who was one of his favorite artists, and asked him to collaborate on it. Then the team decided to include Tainy to contribute to the production and finally, as Turizo "felt that a strong contrasting voice was missing", Rauw Alejandro joined the recording. During an interview with El Espectador, Turizo told the newspaper that the track "has a different sound" from what he usually hears on his songs, "but that's the idea of ​​this album that's on the way".

On October 8, 2020, "La Nota" was released for digital download and streaming by La Industria, Inc. and Sony Music Latin as the second single from Dopamina. It was included as the sixth track on the album, released April 9, 2021.

Music and lyrics

Musically, "La Nota" is a Spanish language reggaeton song, written by Juan Medina, Turizo, Towers, Michael Torres, and Alejandro. Its production was handled by Zenzei, Tainy, and Julián Turizo, and the track runs for a total of 3 minutes and 36 seconds. Lyrically, "La Nota" which translates to "The Note" in English, is a sensual song about a young unmarried woman, whose "flirtatious and mysterious" manner "drive[s] men crazy". The lyrics include, "Sin hablar tú y yo nos entendemos / Ambos sabemos lo que sigue / Y aprovecha que nos conocemos / Colaboremos pa' que se dé / Que la nota le suba pa’ que mueva su cintura" (Without speaking, you and I understand each other / We both know what's next / And take advantage of the fact that we know each other / Let's collaborate so that it happens / Let the grade go up so that you move your waist).

Critical reception
Upon release, "La Nota" was met with widely positive reviews from music critics. Writing for Los 40, Jermaine Miller Miller described it a "great song" that features "a lot of energy and sensuality, but with a flow that is very contagious", naming Alejandro and Towers "the leaders of the new generation of urbano music". Happy FM critics called the melody "very catchy", saying "you won't be able to stop listening to [it] from the first moment". Billboard staff labeled the song "[a] bop", while an author of Billboard Argentina described the artists as "three of the greatest performers in the urban industry". In 2022, Ernesto Lechner from Rolling Stone ranked the track as Alejandro's 42nd-best song, naming the singer as the one who "steals the spotlight" in the collaboration, "adding tension and adrenaline to a hit that would remain middle of the road if not for the fiery inspiration of his verses".

Accolades
"La Nota" was nominated for Urban Song at the 2021 Premios Nuestra Tierra. At the 2021 MTV Millennial Awards, the song was nominated for Music-Ship of the Year, but lost to "Baila Conmigo" by Selena Gomez and Alejandro. "La Nota" was also nominated for Urban – Song Of The Year at the 34th Annual Lo Nuestro Awards. Additionally, it was acknowledged as an award-winning song at the 2021 SESAC Latina Music Awards, the 2022 ASCAP Latin Awards, and the 2022 BMI Latin Awards.

Commercial performance
"La Nota" debuted at number 11 on the US Billboard Hot Latin Songs chart on October 24, 2020, becoming Turizo's 17th entry, Alejandro's 9th, and Towers' 19th. On January 23, 2021, the track reached its peak of number five, giving both Turizo and Alejandro their second top-10 hit on the chart. It also peaked at number one on both the Latin Airplay and Latin Rhythm Airplay charts on the same date. Thus it became Turizo's fourth crowning hit on both, as well as both Alejandro and Towers' third. The song was certified 11× platinum (Latin) by the Recording Industry Association of America (RIAA), for track-equivalent sales of over 660,000 units in the United States.

In Spain's official weekly chart, the song debuted at number nine on October 18, 2020. It subsequently peaked at number one on its third week, becoming Turizo's second number one hit in the country and both Alejandro and Towers' first. The track was later certified quadruple platinum by the Productores de Música de España (PROMUSICAE), for track-equivalent sales of over 160,000 units in the country. "La Nota" also peaked at number one in Chile, Colombia, Ecuador, and Mexico, and reached the top 10 in Bolivia, Costa Rica, Dominican Republic, El Salvador, Guatemala, Latin America, Panama, Peru, Puerto Rico, and Uruguay. In Mexico, the song was certified diamond + gold by the Asociación Mexicana de Productores de Fonogramas y Videogramas (AMPROFON), for track-equivalent sales of over 330,000 units. It was also certified gold by Pro-Música Brasil for track-equivalent sales of over 20,000 units in Brazil.

Promotion

Music video

An accompanying music video was released simultaneously with the song. During his interview with El Espectador, Turizo explained that they had to record the video five times "due to the whole issue of COVID-19". The visual was produced by 2 Wolves SOTA Films and directed by Venezuelan director Daniel Duran. It depicts the three singers turning into real-life toys, trying to get the attention of the beautiful girl they like, who is enjoying her time at an empty arcade cabinet and toy store. An author of LatinPop Brasil praised the video for its "special effects, sensuality and a touch of surprise".

Live performances
Turizo, Alejandro, and Towers gave their first live performance of "La Nota" at the 27th Annual Billboard Latin Music Awards on October 21, 2020. The song was included on the set lists for Alejandro's the Rauw Alejandro World Tour and the Vice Versa Tour.

Track listing

Credits and personnel
Credits adapted from Tidal.

 Manuel Turizo associated performer, composer, lyricist
 Rauw Alejandro associated performer, composer, lyricist
 Myke Towers associated performer, composer, lyricist
 Juan Medina composer, lyricist
 Michael Torres composer, lyricist
 Santiago Mesa "Zenzei" producer, recording engineer
 Marcos Masís "Tainy" producer
 Julián Turizo producer
 Ernesto Padilla "Nesty" producer
 David Daza executive producer
 Alejandro Patiño "Mosty" mastering engineer, mixing engineer

Charts

Weekly charts

Monthly charts

Year-end charts

Certifications

Release history

See also

 2020 in Latin music
 2021 in Latin music
 List of best-selling singles in Spain
 List of Billboard Hot Latin Songs and Latin Airplay number ones of 2021
 List of Billboard Mexico Airplay number ones
 List of number-one songs of 2020 (Mexico)
 List of number-one singles of 2020 (Spain)

References

2020 songs
2020 singles
Manuel Turizo songs
Myke Towers songs
Rauw Alejandro songs
Songs written by Rauw Alejandro
Spanish-language songs